Sundeep Kishan (born 7th May 1987) is an Indian actor and producer who works in predominately in Telugu apart from a few Tamil films.

Career
Sandeep Kishan was born in a Telugu family in present-day Chennai. He is the nephew to the cinematographers Chota K. Naidu and Shyam K. Naidu.  He moved to Hyderabad in 2008 to pursue a career in films.

Kishan began working as an assistant director to Gautham Vasudev Menon for a year, before starring in Sneha Geetham.

After working with him in Prasthanam (2010), director Deva Katta referred Kishan to his friends Raj Nidimoru and Krishna D.K., which led to Kishan's casting in his first Hindi venture, Shor in the City. He also did the Telugu movie DK Bose (2018), opposite Nisha Aggarwal.

Kishan stated that he was very happy since his 2015 released film Tiger was appreciated by actors like Ravi Teja, Allu Arjun and R. Narayana Murthy.  He has also acted in Venkatadri Express and Ra Ra... Krishnayya. After the Tamil film Maanagaram, Sundeep signed for his next project titled Nenjil Thunivirundhal, directed by Suseenthiran.

Other work 
Kishan owns a restaurant chain in Hyderabad named Vivaha Bhojanambhu. He also started a saloon business Express Unisex in Vijayawada.

Filmography

Film

Television

Notes

References

External links
 

Living people
21st-century Indian male actors
Indian male film actors
Male actors in Telugu cinema
Male actors in Tamil cinema
Male actors in Hindi cinema
Male actors from Chennai
Telugu male actors
1987 births